Michie may refer to:

People with the surname
 Archibald Michie (1813–1899), Australian lawyer, journalist, Agent-General, Attorney-General of Victoria and politician
 Bill Michie (1935–2017), British politician
 Chris Michie (1948–2003), American musician and composer
 David Michie (1928–2015), Scottish painter
 Dennis Michie (1870–1898), American football coach and U.S. Army officer killed in the Spanish–American War
 Donald Michie (1923–2007), British artificial intelligence researcher
 James Coutts Michie (1859–1919), Scottish painter 
 James Michie (1927–2007), British poet and translator of Latin poetry
 Jimmy Michie, English snooker player
 John Lundie Michie (1882–1946), Scottish professor of Classics at the University of Queensland, Australia
 John Michie (born 1956), British actor
 Pat Michie, Australian psychologist and academic
 Peter Smith Michie (1839–1901), American military engineer and educator
 Ray Michie, Baroness Michie of Gallanach (1934–2008), British politician
 Susan Michie (born 1955), British professor of health psychology at University College London
 Thomas J. Michie (1896–1973), American lawyer and federal judge

People with the given name
 Michie Nakatani (born 1961), Japanese musician
 Michie Tomizawa (born 1961), Japanese voice actress and singer

Places
 Michie, Tennessee
 Michie Stadium, American football stadium at the United States Military Academy in West Point, New York
 Michie Tavern, historic tavern near Charlottesville, Virginia

Japanese feminine given names